Bronisław Antoni Szwarce (October 7, 1834 –February 18, 1904) was a Polish engineer and political activist. Born in France to Polish immigrants and educated there.  He graduated from the Ecole Centrale des Arts et Manufactures in Paris in 1855. He returned to partitioned Poland and joined the radical democratic pro-independence underground. He became part of the Central National Committee but was arrested by the Russian authorities shortly before the January 1863 Uprising and exiled to Siberia.(The CNC became a provisional Polish government and Szwarce, had he not been arrested, would likely have become one of the Uprising's leaders.)

During his exile, Szwarce was one of the few people to meet Walerian Łukasiński, and became a mentor to future Polish leader Józef Piłsudski.

1834 births
1904 deaths
Polish engineers
Polish independence activists
Polish exiles in the Russian Empire
Prisoners of Shlisselburg fortress